(Portuguese), or  (Spanish) , is a generic term for alcoholic beverages that contain between 29% and 60% alcohol by volume (ABV). It originates in the Iberian Peninsula (Portugal and Spain) and in Iberian America (Spanish- and Portuguese-speaking countries of the Americas).

Etymology
The word is a compound of the Iberian languages' words for "water" ( in Castilian;  in Catalan;  in Portuguese;  in Galician) and "burning"/"fiery" ( in Castilian;  in Catalan;  in Portuguese and Galician). The equivalent in English is “firewater”.

Definition 
Aguardientes are strong alcoholic beverages, obtained by fermentation and later distillation of sugared or sweet musts, vegetable macerations, or mixtures of the two. This is the most generic level; by this definition, aguardientes may be made from a number of different sources. Fruit-based aguardientes include those made from oranges, grapes, bananas, or medronho ("cane apple"). Grain-based ones may be made from millet, barley, or rice and tuber-based aguardientes from beet, manioc, or potato, and finally what are classed as "true" aguardientes from sugarcane and other sweet canes, including some species of bamboo.

Cane aguardiente and cachaça are similar, but distinct, products. Brazil thereafter defined cane aguardiente as an alcoholic beverage of between 38% and 54% ABV, obtained by simple fermentation and distillation of sugarcane that has already been used in sugar-production, and that has a distinct flavour similar to rum.  Cachaça, on the other hand, is an alcoholic beverage of between 38% and 48% ABV, obtained by fermenting and distilling sugarcane juice, and may have added sugar up to 6 g/L.

Regulation
According to Spanish and Portuguese versions of European Union spirits regulations, aguardiente and aguardente are generic Spanish and Portuguese terms, respectively, for some of the distilled spirits that are fermented and distilled exclusively from their specified raw materials, contain no added alcohol or flavouring substances, and if sweetened, only "to round off the final taste of the product". However, aguardiente and aguardente are not legal denominations on their own. 

Instead, different categories of aguardientes (spirits in the English version) are established according to raw materials. In the Spanish version, wine spirit (brandy) is aguardiente de vino, fruit spirit is aguardiente de fruta, grain spirit (other than whiskey and neutral grain spirit) is aguardiente de cereales, etc. Many aguardentes have a protected designation of origin, for example: Aguardente de Vinho Douro (wine spirit of Douro), Aguardente Bagaceira Bairrada (grape marc of Bairrada), Aguardente de pêra da Lousã (pear spirit of Lousã), Aguardiente de sidra de Asturias (cider spirit of Asturias) or Aguardiente de hierbas de Galicia (herbal spirit of Galicia).

Regional variations
Some drinks named aguardiente or similar are of different origin (grape pomace, sugar cane); other drinks with the same origin may have different names (klairin, brandy).

Brazil

In Brazil, a beverage known as cachaça or pinga, considered distinct from traditional aguardiente, is made from sugar cane. Cachaça, has two varieties: unaged (white) and aged (gold). White cachaça is usually bottled immediately after distillation and tends to be cheaper. It is often used to prepare caipirinha and other beverages in which cachaça is an ingredient. Dark cachaça, usually seen as the "premium" variety, is aged in wood barrels, and is meant to be drunk neat. Traditionally, no herbs are used to flavour the cachaça, and its flavour is influenced by the fermentation agent, time spent in the cask, or type of wood from which the barrel is made.

One form that can be qualified as moonshine is known as "Maria Louca" ("Crazy Mary"). This is aguardente, made in jails by inmates. It can be made from many cereals, ranging from beans to rice or whatever can be converted into alcohol, be it fruit peels or candy, using improvised and illegal equipment.

Cape Verde

Grogue, also known as grogu or grogo (derived from English grog), is a Cape Verdean alcoholic beverage, an aguardiente made from sugarcane. Its production is fundamentally artisanal, and nearly all the sugarcane is used in the production of grogue. The cane is processed in a press known as a trapiche.

Chile

In Chile, aguardiente is an alcoholic beverage of 45% and higher ABV (beverages with over 55% ABV are illegal). It is made, like Italian grappa, by distilling the grape residue, primarily the skins and pulp plus the stems and seeds, left over from winemaking after pressing the grapes. Dried mint, peeled walnuts, almonds, and other aromatic herbs are also used to flavor the aguardiente. It is mainly consumed by itself, or as a base to make cola de mono (monkey tail).

Colombia

In Colombia, aguardiente is an anise-flavoured liqueur derived from sugar cane, popular in the Andean region. Each department of Colombia holds the rights to produce it, but aguardiente produced in one region can not be sold in another. By adding different amounts of aniseed, different flavours are obtained, leading to extensive marketing and fierce competition between brands. Aguardiente has 24%–29% alcohol content. Other anise-flavoured liqueurs similar to aguardiente, but with a lower alcohol content, are also sold. Aguardiente has maintained, since the Spanish era, the status of the most popular alcoholic beverage in the Andean regions of Colombia, with the notable exception of the Caribbean region, where rum is most popular. In general, aguardiente is rarely drunk in cocktails, and usually drunk neat.

In the Caribbean coast there is a moonshine called "Cococho", an aguardiente infamous for the number of blindness cases due to the addition of methanol.

Costa Rica

In Costa Rica it has 30% alcohol and has a neutral flavour. Guaro is tightly controlled by the Costa Rican government to help prevent clandestine production.

Guam and the Mariana Islands

In Guam and the Mariana Islands, a distilled version of tubâ (coconut palm wine introduced from the Philippines) is known as aguajente (also aguayente or agi). It is similar to Filipino lambanóg. It used to be prevalent among the Chamorro people but is now largely extinct, after the United States banned its manufacture soon after the acquisition of Guam from the Spanish Empire in 1899.

Ecuador

In Ecuador, aguardiente is also derived from sugar cane, but unlike Colombia, it is left largely unflavoured.  It is then taken straight as shots, mulled with cinnamon (canela in Spanish) and fruit juices to make the hot cocktail canelazo, or mixed with the juice of naranjilla and spices for the hot cocktail draquita.  Locally or artisanally made aguardiente is commonly called punta, "puro" or trago, and alcohol content can vary widely, from "mild" puntas of about 10% to "strong" of about 40% or higher.  The traditional distillation process produces aguardiente as strong as 60 g/L.  Every Ecuadorian province has a slightly different flavour to the aguardiente produced there, and equally each province has a different recipe for canelazo. In Ecuador, aguardiente is the most commonly consumed strong alcohol. Aguardiente Astillero is one of the newest brands, which is becoming very popular due to its symbolic title especially around Guayas.

Mexico
In Mexico, aguardiente goes by many names, including habanero. In the state of Michoacán, charanda is a traditional rum-like sugar cane aguardiente.

Casa Berreteaga marketed an aguardiente called “Berreteaga” which used sugar cane sourced from the Coxcatlan region of Puebla.  Berreteaga was a fortified wine made from rum and sweet wine (usually muscat) or (uncommonly) a sweet brandy which was then aged in oak barrels

Portugal

Portuguese aguardente has several varieties. Aguardente vínica is distilled from wine, either of good quality or undrinkable wines. It is mostly used to fortify wines such as port or aged to make aguardente velha (old burning water), a kind of brandy. Aguardente bagaceira is made from pomace as a way to prevent waste after the close of wine season. It is usually bootlegged, as most drinkers only appreciate it in its traditional formulation of 50% to 80% ABV. A common way to drink it is as café com cheirinho ("coffee with a little scent"), a liqueur coffee made with espresso.

In the Azores, this espresso-aguardente combination is commonly referred to as café com música (coffee with music). Aguardente Medronho is a variety distilled from the fruit of the Arbutus unedo tree.

In Madeira, it is the core ingredient for poncha, a beverage around which a festival is based. Most of the aguardente from the region is made from sugar cane.

Spain

In certain areas of the Pyrenees, aguardiente, known locally to Catalonians as aiguardent, is used as an essential ingredient in the preparation of tupí, a type of cheese.

Galicia is renowned for the quality and variety of its aguardientes, including augardente de bagazo (Aguardiente de Orujo), which is obtained from the distillation of the pomace of grapes, and is clear and colourless. It typically contains over 50% alcohol, sometimes significantly more, and is still made traditionally in many villages across Galicia today. Augardente de herbas, usually yellow in colour, is a sweet liqueur made with Augardente de bagazo and herbs (herbas), with chamomile being a substantial ingredient. Licor café (typical distilled drink in the province of Ourense), black in colour, is a sweet liqueur made with augardente de bagazo, coffee (café), and sugar. Crema de Augardente" or "Crema de Caña is a cream liqueur based on augardente, coffee, cream, milk and other ingredients. It is similar to Irish cream liqueur. In some places in Galicia, a small glass is traditionally taken at breakfast time as a tonic before a hard day's work on the land. The word orujo is actually Spanish and not Galician but is used to distinguish Galician and some Spanish augardentes from those of other countries.

Most of the moonshine in Spain is made as a byproduct of wine making by distilling the squeezed skins of the grapes. The basic product is called orujo or aguardiente (burning water). The homemade versions are usually stronger and have a higher alcoholic content, well over the 40% that the commercial versions typically have. It is often mixed with herbs, spices, or fruits, or with other distillates. Types include pacharán, licor de café and orujo de hierbas (tea mixed with orujo).

United States
During the mission and rancho periods of California history, aguardiente was made out of mission grapes. It was popular during the Gold Rush of 1849.

See also 
Schnapps

References

Galician cuisine
Distilled drinks
Spanish distilled drinks
Portuguese distilled drinks
Mexican distilled drinks
Colombian cuisine
Anise liqueurs and spirits
Brazilian distilled drinks
Chilean cuisine
Spanish words and phrases
Portuguese words and phrases
Galician words and phrases
Catalan words and phrases
Cape Verde distilled drinks
Chilean distilled drinks
Colombian distilled drinks
Costa Rican distilled drinks
Guam distilled drinks
Mariana Island distilled drinks
Ecuadorian distilled drinks
Italian distilled drinks
Sardinian distilled drinks
American distilled drinks